Bangkok Metro may refer to:

MRT (Bangkok), one of the rapid transit systems serving Bangkok
Bangkok Metro Public Company limited, the operator of the MRT, now part of Bangkok Expressway and Metro PCL
Bangkok Metropolis, the city limits of Bangkok
Bangkok Metropolitan Region, the city's wider urban agglomeration
Bangkok Metropolitan Administration, the local government of Bangkok

See also
Rail transport in Bangkok
Mass Rapid Transit Master Plan in Bangkok Metropolitan Region